The following lists events that happened in 1922 in El Salvador.

Incumbents
President: Jorge Meléndez 
Vice President: Alfonso Quiñónez Molina

Events

February
 11 February – C.D. Once Lobos, a Salvadoran football club, was established.

Undated

 The El Salvador Symphony Orchestra was established.

References

Bibliography

 
El Salvador
1920s in El Salvador
Years of the 20th century in El Salvador
El Salvador